Charles Kopp (born 1902, date of death unknown) was a Swiss swimmer. He competed in the men's 100 metre freestyle event and the water polo at the 1924 Summer Olympics.

References

External links
 

1902 births
Year of death missing
Swiss male freestyle swimmers
Swiss male water polo players
Olympic swimmers of Switzerland
Olympic water polo players of Switzerland
Swimmers at the 1924 Summer Olympics
Water polo players at the 1924 Summer Olympics
Place of birth missing
20th-century Swiss people